Heart Like a Levee is the seventh studio album by American band Hiss Golden Messenger. It was released on October 7, 2016, under Merge Records.

The album was produced by M.C. Taylor and Bradley Cook (Megafaun) in Durham, North Carolina.

Critical reception
Heart Like a Levee was met with universal acclaim reviews from critics. At Metacritic, which assigns a weighted average rating out of 100 to reviews from mainstream publications, this release received an average score of 81, based on 12 reviews.

Accolades

Track listing

Personnel 

 MC Taylor - lead vocals, acoustic and electric guitars, mandolin
 Phil Cook - acoustic and electric guitars, piano, Wurlitzer, clavinet,  organ, banjo, synths, background vocals
 Brad Cook - bass guitar, acoustic guitar, synths, background vocals
 Matt McCaughan - drums, percussion, background vocals
 Chris Boerner - baritone and electric guitars ("Happy Day (Sister My Sister)"), background vocals ("Tell Her I'm Just Dancing")
 Josh Kaufman - electric guitar ("Tell Her I'm Just Dancing", "Highland Grace")
 Ryan Gustafson - electric guitar ("Like a Mirror Loves a Hammer")
 Michael Lewis - saxophone, background vocals
 Matt Douglas - saxophone, baritone saxophone
 Rob Moose - strings
 Alexandra Sauser-Monnig - background vocals
 Tift Merritt - background vocals
 Sonyia Turner - background vocals

Charts

References

2016 albums
Hiss Golden Messenger albums
Merge Records albums